The Henry Grover House is a historic house at 223–225 Cambridge Street in Winchester, Massachusetts.  The wood-frame -story double house was built in the 1880s by Henry Grover, who farmed  of surrounding land.  In the late 20th century, the Purcell family operated a flower stand on the property known as "Purcell's Pansy Patch".  When the site was developed for housing beginning in 2009, the house was rehabilitated as part of the development.

The house was built in 1885 and added to the National Register of Historic Places in 1989.

See also
National Register of Historic Places listings in Winchester, Massachusetts

References

Houses on the National Register of Historic Places in Winchester, Massachusetts
Houses in Winchester, Massachusetts